This list of city nicknames in Illinois compiles the aliases, sobriquets and slogans that Illinois cities are known by (or have been known by historically), officially and unofficially, to municipal governments, local people, outsiders, or their tourism boards or chambers of commerce. City nicknames can help in establishing a civic identity, helping outsiders recognize a community or attracting people to a community because of its nickname; promote civic pride; and build community unity. Nicknames and slogans that successfully create a new community "ideology or myth" are also believed to have economic value. Their economic value is difficult to measure, but there are anecdotal reports of cities that have achieved substantial economic benefits by "branding" themselves by adopting new slogans.

Some unofficial nicknames are positive, while others are derisive. The unofficial nicknames listed here have been in use for a long time or have gained wide currency.

Nicknames by city
Algonquin – Gem of the Fox River Valley
Arlington Heights – Action Heights
Aurora – City of Lights
Batavia
The Windmill City
City of Energy
Beardstown – Watermelon Capital
Belleville – Belle-Vegas
Bloomington – The Evergreen City
Bloomington–Normal together
Blo-No
The Twin Cities
Buffalo Grove – The Gymnastics Capital of Illinois
Canton – Plow City
Champaign–Urbana
Chambana
Twin Cities
Charleston – Chucktown
Chester – The Home of Popeye
Chicago (A to Z)
Chi-Town
Chiraq
City in a Garden (literal translation of city motto, Urbs in horto)
The City of the Big Shoulders (from Chicago, a Carl Sandburg poem)
The City That Works (by Mayor Daley, for example)
Mud City
The Second City
The White City (referencing the World's Columbian Exposition)
The Windy City

Collinsville – Horseradish Capital of the World
Crystal Lake – A Good Place to Live
Decatur
D-Town
Soybean Capital of the World
Soy City
DeKalb – Barbed Wire Capital of the World
Des Plaines – City of Destiny
East St. Louis
City of Champions
East Boogie
East Side
ESL
Effingham – The Ham
Elgin
The City in the Suburbs
The City to Watch
Evanston – Heavenston
Freeport – Pretzel City, USA
Griggsville – Purple Martin Capital of the WorldClaims to Fame - Birds, ePodunk, accessed April 16, 2007.
Glen Ellyn – Babcock's Grove
Huntley – The Friendly Village with Country Charm
Joliet
City of Champions
City of "Snap and Progress"
City of Steel (or City of Steel and Stone)Joliet, Illinois, Encyclopedia of Chicago
City of Stone
Prison City (or Prison Town)Joliet Central High School History , Joliet Township High School District 204 website, accessed October 28, 2011. Before 1935, the school's sports teams were known as "The Prison City Boys."
J-Town
Kankakee – Key City
Kewanee – Hog Capital of the World
Lombard – The Lilac Village
Lisle – The Arboretum Village
Marion – Hub City of the Universe
Marseilles
Martucky
Best Little Town by a Dam Site
Mattoon – Bagel Capital of the World
Maywood – Village of Eternal Light
Melrose Park – Corporate King of the Suburbs
Metropolis – The Home of Superman
Moline – Plow Capital of the World
Monmouth – The Maple City
Morton – Pumpkin Capital of the World
Olney – Home of the White Squirrels
Park Ridge – Home of the Hawks
Pana – City of Roses
Pekin
Celestial City
Marigold Capital of the World
Peoria – P-Town
Quincy – Gem City
Rantoul – Rantucky
Rockford
The Forest City
Screw City
Springfield 
Flower City
Springpatch
St. Charles – The Pride of the Fox
Teutopolis – T-Town
Thomson – The Melon Capital of the World
Warrenville – For a Visit, Or a Lifetime
Wilmington – The Island City

See also
 List of municipalities in Illinois
 List of city nicknames in the United States

References

External links
 a list of American and a few Canadian nicknames
 U.S. cities list

City nicknames
Illinois